James Unsworth may refer to:
 James Unsworth (cricketer)
 James Unsworth (entertainer)